Eddie Lane is an American songwriter.  He was director of public relations for Muzak.

His song "Bless You, for Being an Angel" [written jointly with Don Baker (songwriter)] has been recorded by many artists, including The Ink Spots, Fats Waller, The Chords, and Glenn Miller (vocal: Ray Eberle).

External links 

 Billboard Magazine 3 Aug 1946
 Bless You, for being an Angel lyrics

Living people
American male songwriters
Year of birth missing (living people)